The Buckeye Manufacturing Company was a company noted for manufacturing gasoline engines and farm implements. It manufactured the engines for its sister company, the Union Automobile Company.

In time the Lambert founded automobile related subsidiary companies such as the Union Automobile Company, the Lambert Automobile Company, and the Lambert Gas and Gasoline Engine Company. Buckeye Manufacturing Company manufactured the components of the cars assembled by these subsidiaries. The company later produced automobiles and it continued until 1917.

History
A single Buckeye gasoline buggy automobile was built by the company in 1890, and offered for sale in 1891, though none were produced.

See also

 Union automobile
 Lambert automobile

References

Sources

Further reading 
 Dolnar, Hugh; The Lambert, 1906 Line of Automobiles; Cycle and Automobile Trade Journal, volume 10, issue 7 (pages=225–229), 1906
 
 
 Nawale,Suraj Dattatray (2014), Multispeed Right Angle Friction Gear, International Journal of Engineering and Technical Research (IJETR) (pages=184–191), volume 2, issue 9, ISSN 2321-0869
 Netterville, J. J., Centennial History of Madison County, IN, Anderson, Indiana, Historian's Association, 1925
 The Horseless Age: The Automobile Trade Magazine, The Horseless Age Company, 1902
 Bailey, L. Scott, Historic Discovery: 1891 Lambert, Claim for America's First Car, "Antique Automobile" magazine, V4, #5, Oct–Nov 1960
 
 
 
 Huffman, Wallace Spencer, Indiana's Place in Automobile History in Indiana History Bulletin, vol 44, no. 2, Feb. 1967; Indianapolis, Indiana Historical Bureau

External links

 Buckeye Manufacturing Co 1915

Defunct motor vehicle manufacturers of the United States
Motor vehicle manufacturers based in Indiana
Defunct manufacturing companies based in Indiana
Anderson, Indiana
Manufacturing companies established in 1884
Vehicle manufacturing companies established in 1902
1884 establishments in Ohio
1900s cars
1910s cars
Historic American Engineering Record in Indiana
Brass Era vehicles
Veteran vehicles
Highwheeler